Barsin is a village in Khyber Pakhtunkhwa province of Pakistan. It is located at 34°5'45N 73°7'30E with an altitude of 1112 metres (3651 feet).

References

Villages in Khyber Pakhtunkhwa